This is a list of banks in Oman.

Central bank 
 Central Bank of Oman

Local banks 

Bank Muscat
 Bank Dhofar 
 National Bank of Oman
Sohar International
 Oman Arab Bank
 HSBC Oman
 Ahli Bank
 Bank Nizwa
 Alizz Islamic Bank
 First Abu Dhabi Bank Oman
 Qatar National Bank Oman
 Standard and Charter Bank Oman
 State Bank of India Oman
 Habib Bank Limited Oman
 Beirut Oman Bank

Oman
Banks
Banks

Oman